Mystified is the debut EP by Joe Scarborough (credited as "Scarborough"), released on June 23, 2017.

Track listing
 "Mystified" – 4:52
 "Superbad" – 3:37
 "Time Rolls On" – 3:34
 "Girl Like That" – 4:23
 "Let's Fall in Love" – 4:40

References

2017 debut EPs
EPs by American artists